Daniel Bukvich (born 1954) is an American composer and percussionist. He has been a professor of percussion and music theory at the Lionel Hampton School of Music at the University of Idaho since 1978. He is heavily involved in the Lionel Hampton Jazz Festival and DancersDrummersDreamers, both major events on campus.

Early life
Bukvich was born in 1954 in Butte, Montana. He completed his undergraduate studies at Montana State University and earned a Master of Music in composition from the University of Idaho.

Teaching career
Bukvich began teaching at the University of Idaho in 1978. His runs the percussion studio, teaches freshman music theory and aural skills, and directs the jazz choir. He also performs with the Palouse Jazz Project, a faculty jazz ensemble, and teaches the university's jazz theory course.

Compositions
Bukvich has composed pieces for the music school's wind ensemble, orchestra, jazz choir, chorus, and percussion ensembles. His compositions include two symphonies, a marimba sonata, and concertos for clarinet, viola, and xylophone.

References

1954 births
American male composers
21st-century American composers
American percussionists
Living people
Montana State University alumni
University of Idaho alumni
University of Idaho faculty
21st-century American male musicians